The 'Tiga GC83 is a sports prototype race car, designed, developed, and built by British manufacturer Tiga Race Cars, for sports car racing, conforming to the Group C1/C2 rules and regulations, in 1983.

References

Sports prototypes
Group C cars